Rebutia pygmaea is a species of cactus in the genus Rebutia, native to Bolivia and northwest Argentina. It has gained the Royal Horticultural Society's Award of Garden Merit.

References

pygmaea
Plants described in 1922